U.S. Route 29 (US 29) is a north–south United States highway that runs for  from Pensacola, Florida to the western suburbs of Baltimore, Maryland in the Southern United States, connecting the Florida Panhandle to the Baltimore-Washington metropolitan area.  This highway takes on an overall northeast-southwest direction, from its southern terminus at US 90 and US 98 in Pensacola, Florida to its northern terminus at Maryland Route 99 in Ellicott City, Maryland.

The section of US 29 between Greensboro, North Carolina, and Danville, Virginia, has been designated as Future Interstate 785 and has received "Future Interstate" signs in several locations along that route. It will become an official Interstate Highway once improvements have been completed.

From Auburn, Alabama to Greensboro, North Carolina, Interstate 85 (I-85) runs parallel with US 29, which along that stretch, serves primarily as a local route.

Route description 

|-
|FL
|
|-
|AL
|
|-
|GA
|
|-
|SC
|
|-
|NC
|
|-
|VA
|
|-
|DC
|
|-
|MD
|
|-
|Total
|
|}

Florida

US 29 begins at U.S. Route 90 and U.S. Route 98 in downtown Pensacola, Florida. Throughout the state, U.S. 29 is twinned with the unsigned State Road 95.

The entire route in Florida runs within Escambia County.  From its terminus north to State Road 296, it is known as North Palafox Street.  From this point it is known as Pensacola Boulevard north to Ten Mile Road, approximately one mile north of U.S. Route 90 Alternate.   Between SR 296 and the Molino community, U.S. 29 runs parallel to its former routing, which is now County Road 95A. This former routing continues the name North Palafox Street from SR 296 north to Ten Mile Road.

Alabama

US 29, internally designated by the Alabama Department of Transportation as State Route 15 (SR-15), is a southwest-northeast state highway across the southeastern part of the U.S. state of Alabama.  SR-15 ends in Brewton at a junction with US-31 (SR-3) and SR-41, but US-29 continues west with US-31/SR-3 to Flomaton and south on SR-113 to the Florida state line.

U.S. Highway 29 and SR-15 traverse Alabama in a general northeast/southwest slope.  It has never been a major route in the state; its significance was completely overshadowed with the completion of Interstate 65 and Interstate 85 during the 1970s.   Today, US-29 and SR-15 serve primarily to connect numerous smaller towns and cities in the southwest, south-central, and eastern parts of Alabama, notably passing near Troy University, Tuskegee University, and Auburn University in the east.

US Highway 29 no longer passes through downtown Auburn or downtown Opelika. The US Highway is concurrent with Interstate Highway 85 from Exit 51, south of Auburn, to Exit 64, northeast of Opelika. This change was made by Alabama Department of Transportation in the 1990s. Route markers have been appropriately relocated since then.

Georgia

US 29 passes through the northern portion of Georgia, starting in Hart County towards Athens and Gwinnett County and then onward to Atlanta. The highway passes by notable universities, such as Georgia Tech and Emory University in Atlanta and the University of Georgia in Athens. US 29 meanders through Hartwell and the Lake Hartwell region near the South Carolina border. From West Point, Georgia (Just south of LaGrange, Georgia) at the Alabama-Georgia Line to downtown Atlanta, Georgia State Route 8 and Georgia State Route 14 are paired with US 29 at various points in the state. US 29 to the southwest of Atlanta has been named Roosevelt Highway, since Franklin D. Roosevelt made his final journey northward from Warm Springs along this stretch of highway. Large crowds gathered along US 29 on this day in April 1945 to pay their final respects to the deceased President.  Unfortunately for those who waited along the highway they missed seeing the president's body being transported back to Washington on a train that ran on nearby tracks.

South Carolina

In South Carolina, US 29 maintains a northeasterly routing, passing through Anderson, Greenville, and Spartanburg.

From Greenville through Greer, US 29 is known as Wade Hampton Boulevard. It is a major commercial artery for both Greer and Taylors. A six-lane highway, the road forms the western border of Bob Jones University and then passes near Chick Springs, a mineral springs that served as the focus of a small but important resort community during the nineteenth century.

US 29 was built as the main highway between Greenville and the other city of northwestern South Carolina, Spartanburg. The construction of Interstate 85 connecting Greenville to Spartanburg left US 29 underused until recent decades.

North Carolina

In North Carolina, US 29 connects the cities of Gastonia, Charlotte, Concord,  Salisbury, High Point, Greensboro, and Reidsville. US 29 routes through Charlotte along Tryon Street, one of the main arteries that runs through uptown Charlotte. NASCAR's Charlotte Motor Speedway is on US 29 where Charlotte and Concord border.

Virginia

In Virginia, part of U.S. 29 is named the Lee Highway. U.S. 29 connects the historic small cities and large towns of west-central Virginia, including Danville, Lynchburg, Charlottesville, Culpeper, and Warrenton, with Fairfax, Falls Church, Arlington, and Washington, D.C., to the northeast, and with North Carolina to the southwest.

Along its route in Virginia, U.S. 29 provides significant access to and from several major colleges and universities, including the University of Virginia in Charlottesville, George Mason University in Fairfax, Sweet Briar College in Sweet Briar, and Liberty University, University of Lynchburg, and Randolph College in Lynchburg.

District of Columbia

US 29 enters Washington, D.C., via the Francis Scott Key Bridge adjacent to Georgetown University.  The designation turns east onto the Whitehurst Freeway, bypassing Georgetown to the south.  Upon crossing Rock Creek, the freeway ends, becoming the at-grade K Street.  US 29 remains on K Street to 11th Street, where US 29 turns north onto 11th for seven blocks.  At Rhode Island Avenue, US 29 turns right.  US 29 northbound turns left at 6th Street NW (touching US 1 where it turns from Rhode Island Avenue to 6th Street); it follows 6th Street NW for two blocks and then turns left onto Florida Avenue NW, where it then turns right onto Georgia Avenue NW.  US 29 southbound at this point, however, follows 7th Street, NW to Rhode Island Avenue NW.  The route maintains a northerly routing as it passes through northern Washington, D.C. and enters Maryland. During its alignment with Georgia Avenue NW, US 29 bypasses the Howard University campus to the west.

Maryland

In Maryland, US 29 turns northeast onto Colesville Road, interchanges with the Capital Beltway (Interstate 495), becomes Columbia Pike, and interchanges with New Hampshire Avenue (Maryland Route 650), Maryland Route 200 (known as the Intercounty Connector), Maryland Route 198, Maryland Route 32, Maryland Route 175, Maryland Route 100, US 40 and I-70 before terminating at Maryland Route 99 northwest of Ellicott City.

History

Warrenton Turnpike is the former name of US 29 through Prince William County, Virginia. This is the name that was used for this road during the Civil War. Although the road has been expanded past Manassas into four lanes, it remains a rural two lane highway through Manassas National Battlefield Park, where Interstate 66 carries through traffic. On either side of the road through the battlefield, split rail fences define property borders.  The route has also been called the Bill-Beth Highway as it was the name of the children of the original highway developer.

U.S. Route 170

The portion of US 29 from US 70 at Charlotte, North Carolina northeast to Lynchburg, Virginia was U.S. Route 170 from 1926 until 1931, when US 29 became part of the route.  The US 170 designation was then removed and the route remained as US 29 only.

Future

The freeway stretch of US 29 traveling southwest from Greensboro, to Lexington, North Carolina is currently also signed as Interstate 85 Business and US 70. On October 5, 2019, NCDOT submitted an application to AASHTO, and was granted approval, for the removal of the I-85 Business designation from the freeway, and the rerouting of US 70 between Greensboro and Thomasville leaving US 29 on the route. This plan, according to the state, will simplify overhead signage on the freeway, and eliminate the confusion between I-85 and I-85 Bus.

Major intersections
Florida
  in Pensacola
  on the Brent–Ensley line
Alabama
  in Flomaton. The highways travel concurrently to Brewton.
  in Andalusia. The highways travel concurrently through the city.
  in Brantley. The highways travel concurrently to Luverne.
  in Troy
  in Union Springs. The highways travel concurrently through the city.
  in Tuskegee. The highways travel concurrently to Tuskegee National Forest.
  in Auburn. The highways travel concurrently to Opelika.
  in Opelika. The highways travel concurrently through the city.
  in Opelika
  on the Valley–Lanett city line
Georgia
  in LaGrange. The highways travel concurrently through the city.
  in Grantville
  south of East Newnan
  southwest of College Park
  in Atlanta. The highways travel concurrently through the city.
  in Atlanta. US 29/US 78 travel concurrently to the Scottdale–North Decatur city line. US 29/US 278 travel concurrently to Druid Hills.
  in Atlanta. The highways travel concurrently to Decatur.
  in Tucker
  southeast of Bogart. The highways travel concurrently to Athens.
  in Athens. The highways travel concurrently through the city.
South Carolina
  in Anderson. The highways travel concurrently through the city.
  west of Piedmont. The highways travel concurrently to south-southwest of Dunean.
  south-southwest of Dunean
  south-southwest of Dunean
  in Greenville
  in Startex
  west of Spartanburg
  northeast of Blacksburg
North Carolina
  southwest of Kings Mountain. The highways travel concurrently through the city.
  in Kings Mountain. US 29/US 74 travel concurrently to Charlotte.
  in Gastonia
  west of Charlotte
  in Charlotte
  in Charlotte
  northeast of Charlotte
  in Concord. The highways travel concurrently through the city.
  in Concord
  in Salisbury. US 29/US 70 travel concurrently to Greensboro.
  northeast of Spencer. The highways travel concurrently to Lexington.
  in Lexington. The highways travel concurrently through the city.
  in High Point
  south-southwest of Greensboro. The highways travel concurrently to southwest of Greensboro.
  in Greensboro
  in Greensboro. The highways travel concurrently through the city.
  in Greensboro. The highways share a brief concurrency near the city's downtown district.
  in Greensboro
  east of Reidsville
Virginia
  on the Virginia state line at Danville. The highways travel concurrently through the city.
  in Danville
  south of Lynchburg. The highways travel concurrently to east of Lynchburg.
  in Lynchburg. The highways travel concurrently through the city.
  in Amherst
  west-southwest of Charlottesville
  west-northwest of Charlottesville. The highways travel concurrently to Charlottesville.
  in Ruckersville
  south-southwest of Culpeper. The highways travel concurrently to Gainesville.
  south-southeast of Culpeper
  in Opal. The highways travel concurrently to Warrenton.
  in Gainesville
  in Centreville
  in Fairfax. The highways travel concurrently through the city.
  on the Merrifield–West Falls Church city line
  in Arlington
  in Arlington
  in Arlington
District of Columbia
  in Washington, D.C.
  in Washington
Maryland
  in Silver Spring
  in Ellicott City
  in Ellicott City
  in Ellicott City

See also
 Special routes of U.S. Route 29
 U.S. Route 129

References

External links

 Endpoints of U.S. Highway 29

 
Roads with a reversible lane
29